Lophocorona pediasia is a moth of the family Lophocoronidae. It was described by Ian Francis Bell Common in 1973 and is endemic to the arid inland areas of the southern half of Australia.

The wingspan is about 10 mm.

References

Moths described in 1973
Moths of Australia
Endemic fauna of Australia
Lophocoronoidea